is a Japanese manga series written and illustrated by Yukio Katayama, with collaboration of Momoji Higashi. It was serialized in Shogakukan's seinen manga magazine Monthly Big Comic Spirits (2010–11) and Weekly Big Comic Spirits (2012–14), with its chapters collected in thirteen tankōbon volumes.

Publication
The manga was later transferred to Weekly Big Comic Spirits, where it ran from May 14, 2012, to July 28, 2014. Shogakukan collected its chapters in thirteen tankōbon volumes, released from September 30, 2010, to September 30, 2014.

Volume list

Reception
Hanamote Katare ranked #18 on Takarajimasha's Kono Manga ga Sugoi! list of best manga of 2011 for male readers. It was one of the Jury Recommended Works at the 18th Japan Media Arts Festival in 2014.

See also
Furo Girl!, another manga series by the same author
Yoake no Ryodan, another manga series by the same author

References

External links
 

Iyashikei anime and manga
Seinen manga
Shogakukan manga